Helena Vierikko (born 11 August 1980 in Vantaa), is a Finnish actress.
 
She starred in the 2005 film Kaksipäisen kotkan varjossa working with actors such as Mikko Leppilampi and Vesa-Matti-Loiri and director Timo Koivusalo.

Her father is actor Vesa Vierikko.

Filmography
Kaksipäisen kotkan varjossa (2005)
Toinen jalka haudasta (2009)
Luokkakokous (2015)
Luokkakokous 2 – Polttarit (2016)

External links
 

Living people
Finnish actresses
1980 births
People from Vantaa